The Willmering Tourist Cabins Historic District encompasses a historic tourist accommodation on United States Route 65 in central northern Searcy County, Arkansas, just south of the Buffalo National River.  Located behind the Silver Hill Float Service on the west side of the highway stand six stone and timber cabins, with large standstone blocks and plank doors on the fronts, and shed roofs obscured by parapets.  Built in 1946 by Harry Willmering, these vernacular structures are representative of tourist accommodations built in the period after World War II to cater to the automobile-based vacationing public.

The cabins were listed on the National Register of Historic Places in 2000.

See also
National Register of Historic Places listings in Searcy County, Arkansas

References

Hotel buildings completed in 1946
Buildings and structures in Searcy County, Arkansas
Historic districts on the National Register of Historic Places in Arkansas
National Register of Historic Places in Searcy County, Arkansas
Hotel buildings on the National Register of Historic Places in Arkansas